Harold John Kleine (June 8, 1923 – December 10, 1957) was a Major League Baseball pitcher who played for two seasons for the Cleveland Indians, appearing in 11 games during the 1944 season and three games in the 1945 season.

External links
, or Baseball-Reference (Minors), or Retrosheet

1923 births
1957 deaths
Appleton Papermakers players
Baltimore Orioles (IL) players
Baseball players from St. Louis
Cleveland Indians players
Los Angeles Angels (minor league) players
Macon Peaches players
Major League Baseball pitchers
Nashville Vols players
Pueblo Dodgers players
Tulsa Oilers (baseball) players
Wausau Timberjacks players
Wilkes-Barre Barons (baseball) players